Saverio Frank "Sam" DeLuca (May 2, 1936 – September 13, 2011) was an American Professional Football offensive lineman in the American Football League and later a radio and television football coverage broadcaster. He played six seasons, three for the Los Angeles/San Diego Chargers and three for the New York Jets. He was a member of the 1969 New York Jet Championship season on IR. After football, he had a long career in sports broadcasting. He was the color commentator on the Jets’ radio broadcasts on WABC and then WOR before working NFL telecasts for NBC Sports and on the Jets’ pre-season games in the 1970s and 1980s.  He went to Lafayette High School (Brooklyn) with Sandy Koufax, Larry King and Fred Wilpon.

Playing career
DeLuca was a three-year letterman in football at the University of South Carolina from 1954 through 1956. As a starting offensive tackle, he played for head coaches Rex Enright in his first two seasons and Warren Giese as a senior. DeLuca graduated with a Bachelor's degree in Education in 1957. He was inducted into the University of South Carolina Athletic Hall of Fame in 2005. He was also honored by the South Carolina Athletic Hall of Fame.

DeLuca was selected in the second round (23rd overall) by the New York Giants in the 1957 National Football League (NFL) Draft. He signed with the Giants for US $7,000 a year with a $500 bonus. He was to have succeeded starting offensive lineman Bill Austin, who was strongly considering retirement at the time. When Austin decided to play one more year, DeLuca was sent to the Canadian Football League's Toronto Argonauts, where he spent three seasons from 1957 through 1959.

Broadcasting career
DeLuca's first regular sportscasting assignment was hosting the pre- and postgame shows for New York Mets games on WABC-FM in 1968 and 1969. Phil Pepe, then a baseball writer for the Daily News who had graduated a year ahead of DeLuca at Lafayette High School, helped him prepare for the assignment.

Death
DeLuca died at age 75 of pancreatic cancer at his home in Pelham, New York on September 13, 2011.

See also
 List of American Football League players

References

External links
 New York Jets player page

1936 births
2011 deaths
American Football League announcers
American Football League players
American football offensive guards
American football offensive tackles
American people of Italian descent
Deaths from cancer in New York (state)
Deaths from pancreatic cancer
Lafayette High School (New York City) alumni
Los Angeles Chargers players
Major League Baseball broadcasters
National Football League announcers
New York Jets announcers
New York Jets players
New York Mets announcers
People from Pelham, New York
San Diego Chargers players
South Carolina Gamecocks football players
Sportspeople from Brooklyn
Players of American football from New York City